Moulin Blanc or Blanc Moulin is the name of a number of windmills in France and Belgium.

Blanc Moulin, Ellezelles, a tower mill in Hainaut, Belgium.
Blanc Moulin, Ostiches, a tower mill in Hainaut, Belgium.
Moulin Blanc, Brem-sur-Mer, a tower mill in Vendée, France.
Moulin Blanc, Laplaigne, a tower mill in Hainaut, Belgium.
Moulin Blanc, Leers, a tower mill in Nord, France.
Moulin Blanc, Offekerque, a tower mill in Pas-de-Calais, France.
Moulin Blanc, Saint-Amand-Les-Eaux, a tower mill in Nord, France.
Moulin Blanc, Saint-Cyprien, a tower mill in Deux-Sèvres, France.
Moulin Blanc, Saint-Pierre-d'Oléron, a tower mill in Charente-Maritime, France.
Moulin Blanc, Templeuve, a unique windmill in Nord, France.
Moulin des Blancs Manteaux,  a tower mill in Essonne, France.

See also
White Mill (disambiguation)
Witte Molen (disambiguation)
Parc du Moulin Blanc, landscape gardens in Saint-Zacharie, Var, France